The list of ship launches in 1814 includes a chronological list of some ships launched in 1814.


References

Sources

1814
Ship launches